Clive Campbell is a retired association football player who represented New Zealand.

Career
Campbell began his career with Blockhouse Bay before joining Mt Wellington in the mid 1970s and became the first player to reach 200 appearances in the New Zealand National League before finishing his playing days in Australia

He made 17 A-International appearances for New Zealand between 1977 and 1981, scoring 5 times including 2 on his début against New Caledonia. He was part of the squad that qualified for the 1982 FIFA World Cup in Spain but was not included in the 23 man squad at the finals.

In 1997 Campbell took charge of the New Zealand U-15 team for the US Soccer Identification Camp in Portland, Oregon
Campbell is currently assistant coach to Colin Tuaa for Auckland City FC and assistant coach of the New Zealand U-17.

Clive's son Jeff Campbell also represented the All Whites.

References

External links 

Living people
New Zealand association footballers
New Zealand international footballers
National Soccer League (Australia) players
Wollongong Wolves FC players
Association football midfielders
Year of birth missing (living people)